Şafak Edge (born June 17, 1992) is a Turkish professional basketball player for Final Spor of the Turkish Basketball First League (TBL).

References

External links
TBLStat.net Profile
FIBA Profile

1992 births
Living people
Afyonkarahisar Belediyespor players
Bandırma B.İ.K. players
Beşiktaş men's basketball players
Galatasaray S.K. (men's basketball) players
Point guards
Sakarya BB players
Sportspeople from Balıkesir
Turkish men's basketball players
Türk Telekom B.K. players
Uşak Sportif players